Shalinsky District (Şelan khoşt) is an administrative and municipal district (raion), one of the fifteen in the Chechen Republic, Russia. It is located in the center of the republic. Its administrative center is the town of Shali. Population:  68,862 (2002 Census);  The population of Shali accounts for 41.1% of the district's total population.

Healthcare
State health facilities in the district are represented by one central district hospital in Shali and one district hospital in Chiri-Yurt.

References

Notes

Sources

Districts of Chechnya
